The Goleta postal facility shootings were a spree killing perpetrated by Jennifer San Marco on January 30, 2006. San Marco, a former United States Postal Service employee, shot and killed six people in Goleta, California, before taking her own life. Prior to the Goleta shooting, she shot and killed a former neighbor in nearby Santa Barbara.

Shootings
On January 30, 2006, Jennifer San Marco drove to her former condominium in Santa Barbara, California, and killed Beverly Graham, a former neighbor with whom she had previously argued. She then drove to the mail processing plant in Goleta. San Marco entered the sprawling plant's lot by tailgating another car as it passed through the gate. She gained entry to the building by taking an employee's identification badge at gunpoint in order to gain electronic access to the secure staff entrance. She then told the employee to leave; they were unharmed.

At 9:00 p.m., San Marco shot Ze Fairchild (37) in the head in the building's parking lot. She turned to Maleka Higgins and shot her at point-blank range, then shot Nicola Grant. Some workers, after hearing gunshots, went to the windows to see what was happening. San Marco reportedly turned to them and smiled. Several employees fled to a nearby fire station.

San Marco entered the building (which had around eighty employees inside at the time) and continued firing. Walking into the complex, she shot supervisor Charlotte Colton, who was then dragged into a room by a co-worker. Colton would die two days later in Cottage Hospital. San Marco headed to her former work station and encountered Guadalupe Swartz, who saw her coming and tried to flee. San Marco, however, rapidly fired four shots into Swartz, killing her. Dexter Shannon, a Vietnam War veteran with grandchildren, heard nothing of the gunshots as he was working with headphones on; he was fatally shot at point-blank range. San Marco then took her own life by shooting herself in the head.

Aftermath
Graham's body was linked to the shooting hours after it ended. Neighbors reported gunshots rang out at the condominium at around 7:15 p.m. that night. One victim, Charlotte Colton, had a funeral with over 1,200 mourners. Colton was buried at Cavalry Cemetery. Goleta's mayor, Jonny Wallis, held a news conference in which she praised the police response, condemned the shooting, and offered her condolences to its victims.

Victims

Santa Barbara
Beverly Graham, 54

Post office shooting
Ze Fairchild, 37
Maleka Higgins, 28 
Nicola Grant, 42
Charlotte Colton, 44 
Guadalupe Swartz, 52 
Dexter Shannon, 57

Perpetrator

Background
Jennifer San Marco was born in Brooklyn, New York, to Frank San Marco (1932-1993) and Jeanette San Marco (nee San Pietro) (b. 1933). She went to Edward R. Murrow High School, later attending Brooklyn College. She then studied natural resources management at Rutgers University but did not graduate. In 1989 San Marco came to California, where after studying she was hired as a guard at medium-security Chuckawalla Valley State Prison in Blythe. She quit two days before her probationary period ended, never giving a reason why, but was described as a good worker.

San Marco held down a number of jobs, including a dispatcher for the Santa Barbara Police Department in the mid-1990s, a job for which she underwent a background check and psychological evaluation. She left the job after several months. San Marco then worked at a high school serving lunch before quitting in 2000. She eventually bought a condominium and went to work for the Postal Service as a clerk. She left on psychological disability following a 2003 incident in which she was pulled out from under a mail-sorting machine and had to be wheeled from her workplace by police in handcuffs. San Marco did return briefly, but was again removed from the building due to her erratic behavior and never returned. She was held at a Ventura mental hospital for three days in February 2001.

In 2004 San Marco's car broke down in Grants, New Mexico. She decided to stay and reside there until the shooting. In the small town of Grants, San Marco earned a reputation for strange behavior, which included speaking (or sometimes furiously shouting) to herself, ordering food at restaurants and bolting out the door before eating it, stripping naked in public (often in random parking lots), kneeling and praying in random places (often roadsides), talking to an imaginary friend, screaming death threats, yelling profane rap lyrics and making racist comments. She began getting tattoos and showed them to neighbor Jeannie Steen. When Steen didn't react, San Marco walked around her in a circle and spat on the ground.

In July 2004 San Marco was denied a business license to begin publishing a periodical known as The Racist Press. She also at one point claimed she wanted to register a cat food business and was rejected because she lived in an unincorporated area of Cibola County. While being interviewed there, she would often talk to herself. After the rejection, San Marco would frequently come to the office and stare at an employee named Sonya Salazar and ask to see her. Salazar was often told to hide when she came to the office. San Marco once made a rude accusation that Salazar had slept with someone; authorities were called. She also came into contact with authorities after she appeared naked at a gas station. She was clothed when the officers arrived and ultimately let her off with a warning. These run-ins with authorities were frequent and she was once admonished for driving half-naked. San Marco sold her condominium and told people she was going to visit a sister on the East Coast.

In November, a mental health clinic manager named Darlene Hayes reported she saw San Marco alone in a post office parking lot kneeling at her car and talking to herself. When asked what she was doing, she replied, "They pray before they get in." She was supposedly talking about her sister and brother (whom she apparently believed were there). Hayes called the police and left several minutes later. According to a police lieutenant, there was no record of Hayes' call. A man who delivered propane gas to San Marco and described her as polite noted that she always paid her bills on time, though he had noticed her talking to an "imaginary friend."

Possible motives and preparation
San Marco was apparently convinced that she was the target of a nefarious conspiracy centered at the Goleta postal facility, according to writings recovered from her home in New Mexico. A spokesman for the Santa Barbara County Sheriff's Office conjectured that San Marco's paranoia and history of mental illness may have motivated her to commit the murders. Racism was also a possible influence in the shooting, as six of the victims were minorities (three were black, one was Chinese-American, one was Hispanic and one was Filipino). She may have also murdered Graham for personal reasons, as the two previously had disputes. According to Graham's boyfriend, San Marco would often go outside and start singing loudly. Graham also complained to her brother that San Marco would come out and "rant and rave" in front of her building.

Among San Marco's writings were error-laden explanations of various religions and a confusing theory linking the U.S. government to serial killer David Berkowitz, the Ku Klux Klan and racist murders. A diary with over 100 pages was also found full of meticulously tracked perceived slights and offenses she received from people. An auto body worker once said San Marco claimed that the Postal Service mistreated her, but that she never said anything violent or talked about murder (only that they had to "pay", which may indicate revenge as another possible motive).

San Marco purchased the murder weapon and ammunition from two different pawn shops (one in Grants, the other in Gallup). She was able to do this with no problem, and passed background checks. She also got a buzz cut hairstyle, which left her barely recognizable (and may have helped her in gaining entry into the building to commit the shooting).

See also
List of postal killings
Going postal
 List of homicides in California

References

Murder–suicides in California
Murder in California
2006 murders in the United States
shootings
Mass murder in 2006
2006 mass shootings in the United States
Spree shootings in the United States
Crimes in California
History of Santa Barbara County, California
Mass murder in California
Workplace violence in the United States
Attacks in the United States in 2006
January 2006 events in the United States
Mass shootings in California
Mass shootings in the United States
Mass murder in the United States